A hill is a landform that extends above the surrounding terrain. It often has a distinct summit.

Terminology

The distinction between a hill and a mountain is unclear and largely subjective, but a hill is universally considered to be not as tall, or as steep as a mountain.

In practice, mountains in Scotland are frequently referred to as "hills" no matter what their height, as reflected in names such as the Cuillin Hills and the Torridon Hills. In Wales, the distinction is more a term of land use and appearance and has nothing to do with height.

For a while, the US defined a mountain as being  or more tall. Any similar landform lower than this height was considered a hill. The United States Geological Survey, however, has concluded that these terms do not in fact have technical definitions in the US

A hillock is a small hill. Other words include knoll and (in Scotland, Northern Ireland and northern England) its variant, knowe.  Artificial hills may be referred to by a variety of technical names, including mound and tumulus.

Hills may form through geomorphic phenomena: faulting, erosion of larger landforms such as mountains and movement and deposition of sediment by glaciers (notably moraines and drumlins or by erosion exposing solid rock which then weathers down into a hill). The rounded peaks of hills results from the diffusive movement of soil and regolith covering the hill, a process known as downhill creep.
 
Various names may be used to describe types of hills, based on appearance and method of formation. Many such names originated in one geographical region to describe a type of hill formation peculiar to that region, though the names are often adopted by geologists and used in a wider geographical context. These include:

 Brae – Scots, Ulster, and North of England term for a hillside or brow of a hill. 
 Drumlin – an elongated whale-shaped hill formed by glacial action.
 Butte – an isolated hill with steep sides and a small flat top, formed by weathering.
 Kuppe  – a rounded hill or low mountain, typical of Central Europe. 
 Tor – a rock formation found on a hilltop; also used to refer to the hill, especially in South West England and the Peak District.
 Puy – used especially in the Auvergne, France, to describe a conical volcanic hill.
 Pingo – a mound of earth-covered ice found in the Arctic and Antarctica.

Historical significance

Many settlements were originally built on hills, either to avoid floods (particularly if they were near a large body of water), for defense (since they offer a good view of the surrounding land and require would-be attackers to fight uphill), or to avoid densely forested areas. For example, Ancient Rome was built on seven hills, helping to protect it from invaders.

Some settlements, particularly in the Middle East, are located on artificial hills consisting of debris (particularly mudbricks) that has accumulated over many generations. Such a location is known as a "tell".

In Northern Europe, many ancient monuments are sited in heaps. Some of these are defensive structures (such as the hillforts of the Iron Age), but others appear to have hardly any significance. In Britain, many churches at the tops of hills are thought to have been built on the sites of earlier pagan holy places. The Washington National Cathedral in Washington, D.C. has followed this tradition and was built on the highest hill in that city.

Military significance

Hills provide a major advantage to an army, giving them an elevated firing position and forcing an opposing army to charge uphill to attack a fort or other position. They may also conceal forces behind them, allowing a force to lie in wait on the crest of a hill, using that crest for cover, and firing on unsuspecting attackers as they broach the hilltop. As a result, conventional military strategies often demand possession of high ground.

Hills have been the sites of many noted battles, such as the Battle of Alesia in 52 BC and the first recorded military conflict in Scotland, the Battle of Mons Graupius in AD 83. Modern era conflicts include the 1775 Battle of Bunker Hill (which was actually fought on Breed's Hill) in the American War of Independence; and Cemetery Hill and Culp's Hill in the 1863 Battle of Gettysburg, the turning point of the American Civil War. The Battle of San Juan Hill in the 1898 Spanish–American War won Americans control of Santiago de Cuba.  

Battles for high ground have often resulted in extensive losses to both attackers and defenders, such as the 1969 Battle of Hamburger Hill during the Vietnam War, the Battle of Stalingrad and Battle of Peleliu during World War II, and the 1969 Kargil War between India and Pakistan.

The Great Wall of China is an enduring example of hilltop fortification. It was built on hilltops to help defend against invaders from the north, such as Mongols.

Sports and games

Hillwalking is a British English term for a form of hiking which involves the ascent of hills. The activity is usually distinguished from mountaineering as it does not involve ropes or technically difficult rock climbing, although the terms mountain and hill are often used interchangeably in Britain. Hillwalking is popular in hilly areas such as the English Peak District and the Scottish Highlands. Many hills are categorized according to relative height or other criteria and feature on lists named after mountaineers, such as Munros (Scotland) and Wainwrights (England). Specific activities such as "peak bagging" (or "Munro bagging") involve climbing hills on these lists with the aim of eventually climbing every hill on the list.

Cooper's Hill Cheese-Rolling and Wake is an annual event in the West Country of England which involves rolling a wheel of cheese down a hill. Contestants stand at the top and chase the wheel of cheese to the bottom. The winner, the one who catches the cheese, gets to keep the wheel of cheese as a prize.

Cross country running courses may include hills which can add diversity and challenge to those courses.

Notable artificial hills

Sophienhöhe, Germany
Monte Kaolino, Germany
 , Sweden
 Malminkartanonhuippu, Finland
 Mausoleum of the First Qin Emperor, China
 Five Sisters Bing, Scotland
 Expedition Everest, Florida
 Monte Stella, Italy
 Blackstrap Ski Hill, Canada
 Jingshan Hill, China
 Silbury Hill, England
 Grizzly Peak, California
 Mount Manisty, England
 Monks Mound, Illinois
 Mount Gushmore, Florida

Gallery

See also

 
 
 
 
 
 
 
 
 ""

References

External links

  Earth Sculpture; Or, The Origin of Land-forms
 The International Geography

 
Slope landforms